Fodiator acutus, the sharpchin flyingfish, is a species of flying fish in the genus Fodiator endemic to the northeast Pacific Ocean and the eastern Atlantic Ocean.

References 

acutus
Fish described in 1847
Fish of the East Atlantic
Fish of the North Pacific